The Story of the Clash, Vol. 1 is a double-disc compilation album by the English punk rock band the Clash. Consisting of 28 tracks, it was released on 29 February 1988 by Epic Records. The compilation presents a relatively thorough overview of their career, but does not feature any material from their final studio album, Cut the Crap (1985). An anticipated second volume was to have consisted of live recordings but remains unreleased, although a live compilation, From Here to Eternity: Live, was released in 1999. The original vinyl set was released with four different colored cover variations: red, blue, yellow and green. The compilation was promoted by reissued singles of "I Fought the Law" and "London Calling".

Liner notes
The extensive inner notes are told from the perspective of frontman Joe Strummer's alter-ego, Albert Transom. Transom, described by himself as "...their valet from the early beginnings to the bitter end...", tells many anecdotes, including one about the beginning of the rioting at the Notting Hill Carnival in 1976. Many of the stories are about shows, such as one where, after their "3rd or 4th time out", Transom and a fellow punk named Sebastian barricaded themselves in a small room and were attacked by a group of "Teddy Boys". The story went that Sebastian's tie was ripped, and the general consensus was that the tie was now "much more punk". Many other musicians are mentioned in the liners, including experiences with Bo Diddley, Devo, and Roxy Music. The notes end with, "If I had to sum it up, I'd say we played every gig on the face of the earth and that's what it's all about...I've just heard they'll give me some room on Vol. 2 so maybe I will be able to tell the bits I've had to skip or leave out."

Track listing

Personnel

The Clash
 Mick Jones – guitar, vocals
 Joe Strummer – vocals, guitar
 Paul Simonon – bass
 Topper Headon – drums
 Terry Chimes – drums

Technical
 Tricia Ronane – compiler
 Pennie Smith – photography
 Jules Balme – sleeve
 The Clash – producer ("The Magnificent Seven", "This Is Radio Clash", "Armagideon Time", "Somebody Got Murdered", "(White Man) in Hammersmith Palais"), co-producer ("I Fought the Law", "Capital Radio One")
 Guy Stevens – producer ("Clampdown", "Train in Vain", "Guns of Brixton", "Lost in the Supermarket", "London Calling", "Spanish Bombs")  
 Bill Price – co-producer ("I Fought the Law", "Capital Radio One"), remastering supervision (1999 version)
 Mikey Dread – producer ("Bankrobber")
 Mickey Foote – producer ("London's Burning", "Janie Jones", "White Riot", "Career Opportunities", "Clash City Rockers", "Police and Thieves"), co-producer ("Complete Control")
 Lee "Scratch" Perry – co-producer ("Complete Control")
 Sandy Pearlman – producer ("Tommy Gun", "Safe European Home", "Stay Free")
 Mick Jones – remixing ("Rock the Casbah", "Should I Stay or Should I Go")
 Bob Clearmountain – engineer ("Rock the Casbah", "Should I Stay or Should I Go", "English Civil War")
 Glyn Johns – mixing ("Straight to Hell")
 Howie Weinberg – mastering
 Ray Staff – remastering (1999 version)
 Bob Whitney – remastering (1999 version)

Charts

Certifications

References

External links
 
 [ The Story of the Clash, Volume 1] at AllMusic

1988 compilation albums
Albums produced by Bill Price (record producer)
The Clash compilation albums
Epic Records compilation albums